Anisoplaca fraxinea is a species of moth of the family Gelechiidae. It was described by Alfred Philpott in 1928 and is endemic to New Zealand. It has been observed in the South Island and adults are on the wing in February and March.

Taxonomy
This species was described by Alfred Philpott in 1928 using specimens collected in March at Flora River, in Kahurangi National Park, and in Nelson. The male holotype specimen, collected at Flora River, is held in the New Zealand Arthropod Collection.

Description

Philpott described this species as follows:

Distribution
This species is endemic to New Zealand. This species has been collected at its type locality of Flora River, in Nelson, at Arthur's Pass, at Price's Valley Bush at Banks Peninsular and at Aoraki / Mount Cook.

Behaviour 
Adults are on the wing in February and March.

References

Anisoplaca
Moths described in 1928
Moths of New Zealand
Endemic fauna of New Zealand
Taxa named by Alfred Philpott
Endemic moths of New Zealand